The National Emergency Medical Services Association (NEMSA or National EMS Association) is a now defunct, registered labor union and California non-profit mutual benefit corporation. NEMSA's membership consists of emergency medical technicians (EMTs), and paramedics.

History 

The National Emergency Medical Services Association (NEMSA) was founded in 2004 when dissatisfaction with union representation led to the creation of an all-EMS union. NEMSA's founding has always been a source of controversy, as founder Torren Colcord was found guilty in Alameda County (CA) Superior Court of fraud, using Service Employee International resources and company time to create and form NEMSA. "It's a substantial judgment for substantial wrongdoing," said Dan Martin, administrative vice president for SEIU-United Healthcare Workers West. "They were on payroll, supposed to be looking out for members, and they did just the opposite. It's an example of what happens when people put their own personal ambitions above the interests of the union."

SEIU was awarded a $442,000 judgement against Colcord, and later Colcord retained the guilty verdict but had the award reduced $300,000 on appeal. NEMSA members later paid for that judgement, plus attorney fees for the appeals case.

NEMSA supporters claimed that rather than a large union that paid no attention to EMS; they wanted a union that was for EMS, by EMS. NEMSA reported that represented 5672 members as a maximum number of members represented according to Federal LM-2 reports.  The Sacramento Business Journal reported that NEMSA represented 5500 members at one point.

NEMSA promotes itself as "a registered labor union and not-for-profit mutual benefit corporation that specializes in the labor representation of pre-hospital EMS Professionals such as EMTs, Paramedics, Dispatchers, Call Takers, Critical Care Nurses, Air Ambulance Flight Nurses and Paramedics, as well as EMS related support staff."  NEMSA represents members in 6 states.

Membership changes 
Beginning in 2007, under the leadership of President Torren Colcord, NEMSA began to see dramatic changes in membership. In 2007, after difficult contract negotiations in Portland, Oregon, NEMSA disclaimed the Portland, Oregon bargaining unit, walking away from representing approximately 500 EMS workers there instead of having their recently negotiated contract rejected.

NEMSA under the leadership of Colcord lost another 1000-1500 East Coast members when those members opted to leave NEMSA in favor of the Teamsters and United EMS Workers-AFSCME Local 4911 in 2009 and 2012

In 2011, NEMSA under the leadership of Colcord lost 140 members in Solano County CA in favor of United EMS Workers-AFSCME Local 4911

In 2012, NEMSA under the leadership of Colcord lost 260 members in Santa Clara County CA in favor of United EMS Workers-AFSCME Local 4911

NEMSA under the leadership of Colcord lost another 2000 members in Northern California in 2012 when those members opted to leave NEMSA in favor of United EMS Workers-AFSCME Local 4911 after a coast to coast victory.

NEMSA under the leadership of Colcord lost another 140 members in Northern California at First Responder EMS Inc of Sacramento in favor of United EMS Workers-AFSCME Local 4911.

NEMSA under the leadership of Colcord lost another 75 members in Northern California at American Medical Response in favor of IAFF.

NEMSA under the leadership of Colcord lost another 350 members in New Haven CT at American Medical Response in favor of IAEP.

NEMSA lost another 500 members to NAGE in San Diego CA at Rural Metro.

NEMSA lost another 30 members from Morrow County EMS to IAEP in Mt. Gilead, Ohio.

Leadership dispute and formation of breakaway union 
In 2010, a dispute over Torren Colcord's leadership of NEMSA led to a long running dispute over who controlled NEMSA.  In the 2010 a union officer election was held. NEMSA refused to recognize the validity of one candidate and did not allow the candidate to run for office.  That candidate, Jimmy Gambone then ran a national write in ballot campaign.  According to the Department of Labor, Gambone was eligible to run for office and should have been placed on the ballot. Gambone was the winner of the election by a large majority of write in votes, Larry Lucus had the second highest and Torren Colcord had the least.  According to the Department of Labor, NEMSA violated federal law in refusing to seat the winning candidate.  NEMSA instead seated another candidate for President, who promptly resigned.  Torren Colcord, NEMSA's outgoing President, still refusing to relinquish any power, was named Executive Director and remained in control of NEMSA.  New bylaws were secretly drafted after the election to allow for the Executive Director Position to be created.  The DOL investigation and resolution to the complaint took nearly two years.

During the time period the complaint was investigated by the Department of Labor, Gambone and his supporters, broke in to the NEMSA offices bringing with them mattresses, boxes of food, cameras to record live with no means to shower for the week they burglarized the office. The local police were called but the burglary was given a thumbs up from the local sheriffs department. Files stolen from the burglars included NEMSA employees private financials including bank routing numbers, SSN’s, home addresses and phone numbers. Gambone and his ilk made phone calls to the employees threatening their lives, finances and employment. The employees in turn had to contact their local police departments, lifelock and feared for their families safety. and left the NEMSA offices with computers, files, and information.  Gambone and his supporters then seized power, naming themselves the NEMSA Board of Directors and unilaterally unseating the existing NEMSA Board of Directors.  Gambone and his agents then began conducting business as NEMSA while the NEMSA Board of Directors Gambone had unseated also continued conducting business as NEMSA.  According to NEMSA, Gambone supporters attempted to intercept dues checks, write checks on NEMSA's bank accounts, and do business as NEMSA during this time

Gambone and his supporters went on to continue working for a rival union, United EMS Workers or UEMSW where he was later deemed unfit and fired.

Financial condition 

Federal LM-2 financial reports required for labor Unions show NEMSA's financial condition as of the end of the 2012 fiscal year for NEMSA. The 2012 report shows NEMSA claimed $12.372.00 in cash on hand and assets totaling $91,338.00 for the fiscal year ending March 31, 2013.  However, NEMSA also reports total liabilities of $695,236.00 including $231,997.00 unpaid in accounts payable.  This leaves NEMSA with total net assets of negative $-603,898.00.

Business practices and legal proceedings 

NEMSA hired the law firm of Goyette and Associates.  In legal documents filed in Sacramento Superior Court, Paul Goyette alleges he was hired as corporate counsel to NEMSA in May 2010 at hourly rates from $225 to $250 an hour. The arrangement changed in April 2011 to a fixed monthly fee of $45,000 for legal and labor representation, plus an hourly fee of $250 for political and criminal defense work.  The deal included acknowledgment that $146, 872 was due from the first agreement, but the law firm agreed not to take action to collect the money unless NEMSA altered or terminated the new agreement before March 2014. If that happened, court documents allege, the money was immediately due — plus $600,000 in liquidated damages.  The money wasn’t paid and the relationship was severed by NEMSA in May 2012. In court documents filed in July, Goyette seeks to collect the more than $825,000 he says is owed.

NEMSA affiliated with NAGE (National Association of Government Employees) in 2012.  The affiliation did not protect NEMSA from losing the Northern California Bargaining Unit. NAGE has since severed the affiliation and filed suit against NEMSA for breach of several contracts, claiming NEMSA did not pay NAGE more than $281,000 owed to NAGE as part of those contracts.  The suit also alleges that Torren Colcord breached an employment contract with NAGE.  In the suit, NAGE alleges "Shortly after NEMSA’s affiliation with NAGE commenced, NAGE discovered that NEMSA’s financial health was not what it was represented to be during the course of NEMSA’s negotiations with NAGE, and, consequently, NEMSA did not have the financial wherewithal to meet its dues obligations to NAGE.  In an effort to salvage the relationship, NAGE initially agreed to rebate to NEMSA some of the dues owed to NAGE under the Affiliation Agreement to NEMSA. In all, NAGE rebated approximately $56,000 to NEMSA. NAGE also paid NEMSA an additional $15,000 in rent pursuant to the Servicing Agreement. NAGE also performed all of the obligations and services called for under the Affiliation and Servicing Agreements prior to the termination of those agreements.  Nonetheless, despite financial assistance from NAGE, and despite that NAGE has met its obligations to NEMSA under the Affiliation and Servicing Agreements, NEMSA failed to meet its financial obligations to NAGE. Of the approximately $456,000 total owed by NEMSA to NAGE pursuant to the Affiliation and Servicing Agreements, NEMSA paid NAGE
only approximately $175,000 and currently owes NAGE approximately $281,000.

Politics 

NEMSA claims it does not advocate or recommend specific political candidates or parties, nor does it participate in politics.

Critics 

EMS workers in Portland, Oregon are critical of NEMSA because NEMSA disclaimed their bargaining unit when NEMSA could not negotiate an acceptable contract for their workforce.  NEMSA walked away from approximately 500 members, leaving them unrepresented.  "Everybody was upset," Charlie Savoie said. "A faction figured maybe we'd been had, and began collecting petitions to file for new representation by the Teamsters."

Former NEMSA member Edward Gavin, Jr. filed a lawsuit against NEMSA in 2011 claiming NEMSA had breached its duty of fair representation owed to Gavin under law.  Gavin alleges "On July 8, 2011 Mr. Gavin found out that at the Step Two grievance hearing he had briefly attended, NEMSA had withdrawn his grievance rather than allowing a decision to be made. The withdrawal of the grievance at the Step Two stage of the grievance process prevented the grievance from being taken to Step Three of the process, arbitration. As a result of the grievance being withdrawn by NEMSA, Mr. Gavin lost the opportunity to have the NEMSA stewards decide whether to take the grievance to arbitration, he lost the opportunity to appeal any decision by NEMSA not to take the grievance over his termination taken to arbitration, he lost the opportunity to have his grievance taken to arbitration, and he lost the opportunity to contest the termination of his employment. The NEMSA representatives had lied to Mr. Galvin after the Step Two hearing, when they led him to believe that the grievance hearing had been litigated to conclusion and awaited a decision. Mr. Gavin had never agreed to the withdrawal of the grievance.

EMS workers in Northern California and New England are critical of NEMSA because of a two year union leadership dispute.  Leaders of this anti-NEMSA movement called themselves "the Transition Team" and are quoted on an anti-NEMSA website as saying "NEMSA - NEMSA is corrupt & undemocratic.. It is run more like a despotic personal business"  and issued a 35-page preliminary report of the problems they found with NEMSA and NEMSA's Executive Director Torren Colcord.  Later this Transition Team would abandon NEMSA and create a new union, as a local affiliate of AFSCME called United EMS Workers Local 4911

Former NEMSA employees have also been critical of NEMSA.  Former NEMSA Employee Jim Misercola wrote a letter describing why he no longer works for NEMSA in which he states "My resignation is due to the extreme philosophical and ideological differences with NEMSA.  NEMSA is no longer the organization that I once tirelessly promoted.  Furthermore it is my opinion that NEMSA is badly mismanaged by its current President Torren Colcord".    Former Co-Founder Tim Bonifay also stated in a letter "I helped create NEMSA because I believed in what the organization could achieve.  But the NEMSA out campaigning today is not the one that I co-founded, and I would be ashamed to be a part of that organization today."

NEMSA members, as reported by EMS Insider have been critical of NEMSA due to NEMSA not providing Board of Directors meeting minutes and/or financial information about NEMSA upon request, in addition to getting poor representation.  Many cases that should have made it to arbitration never did.

References

Healthcare trade unions in the United States
Emergency medical services in the United States
Trade unions established in 2004
Medical and health organizations based in California
Defunct organizations based in California
2004 establishments in the United States
2017 disestablishments in the United States